Achmad Sumardi (born 2 May 1980) is an Indonesian professional footballer who currently plays as a defender for PSM Makassar in the Indonesia Super League.

Career
He moved from Putra Samarinda to Sriwijaya in November 2013.

References

External links
 
 Player profil at goal.com

1980 births
Living people
Indonesian footballers
Liga 1 (Indonesia) players
Persisam Putra Samarinda players
Sriwijaya F.C. players
Association football defenders